Arthur Duff (born 29 March 1883, date of death unknown) was a Jamaican cricketer. He played in one first-class match for the Jamaican cricket team in 1905/06.

See also
 List of Jamaican representative cricketers

References

External links
 

1883 births
Year of death missing
Jamaican cricketers
Jamaica cricketers
People from Saint Ann Parish